Tombigbee State Park is a public recreation area located off Mississippi Highway 6 approximately  east of Tupelo, Mississippi. The state park surrounds  Lake Lee and is named for the nearby Tombigbee River.

History
The state park was among the first state parks built in Mississippi in the 1930s by the Civilian Conservation Corps. The CCC began work on June 1, 1934; the park was opened to the public in 1938. The Tombigbee State Park Historic District was named to the National Register of Historic Places in 1999.

Activities and amenities
The park features lake fishing, primitive and developed campsites, cabins and cottage, picnicking area, and two disc golf courses.

References

External links

Tombigbee State Park Map Mississippi Department of Wildlife, Fisheries, and Parks

Protected areas of Lee County, Mississippi
State parks of Mississippi
Historic districts on the National Register of Historic Places in Mississippi
National Register of Historic Places in Lee County, Mississippi
Parks on the National Register of Historic Places in Mississippi
Protected areas established in 1934
Mississippi placenames of Native American origin